Intercontinental Championship may refer to:

 WWE Intercontinental Championship, a professional wrestling championship created and promoted by the American professional wrestling promotion WWE
 WWF Intercontinental Tag Team Championship, a former professional wrestling championship created and promoted by the American professional wrestling promotion World Wrestling Federation
 IWGP Intercontinental Championship, a professional wrestling championship owned by the New Japan Pro-Wrestling (NJPW) promotion
 Intercontinental Championship for the King Fahd Cup (later renamed to FIFA Confederations Cup), international association football tournament for men's national teams